Ethmia maculifera is a moth in the family Depressariidae. It is found in Japan and Taiwan.

The forewings are overlaid with black markings on a whitish grey background. The hindwings are grey without costal brushes.

The larvae feed on Ehretia dicksonii.

References

Moths described in 1931
maculifera
Moths of Japan